José Arturo Cepeda Escobedo (May 15, 1969) is a Mexican-American prelate of the Roman Catholic Church who has been serving as an auxiliary bishop for the Archdiocese of Detroit since 2011.

Biography

Early life 
Jose Cepeda was born in San Luis Potosi City in Mexico on May 15, 1969, to Jose Cepeda and Maria del Socorro Escobedo. He attended Catholic primary and secondary schools in his city run by the Brothers and Sisters of Joseph.  After spending a year of spiritual formation, Cepeda entered the Seminario Guadalupano Josefino in San Luis Potosi.

After his family immigrated to San Antonio, Texas, Cepeda continued his seminary studies at Our Lady of the Lake University in the city.  He then entered College Seminary of the Immaculate Heart of Mary in Santa Fe, New Mexico, earning a Bachelor of Religious Studies degree with a minor in psychology.  After returning to San Antonio, Cepeda obtained a Master of Divinity degree from Assumption Seminary.

Priesthood 
On June 1, 1996, Cepeda was ordained to the priesthood by Archbishop Patrick Flores for the Archdiocese of San Antonio at St. Mary Magdalen Catholic Church in San Antonio.  After his ordination, Cepeda was assigned as parochial vicar at St, Magdalen Parish while pursuing a Master of Biblical Theology degree from St. Mary’s University.

Cepeda was then sent to Rome to study at the Pontifical University of St. Thomas Aquinas.  In 2005, he was awarded Licentiate in Sacred Theology (STL) and a Doctorate in Sacred Theology (STD) degrees, defending his dissertation in Spiritual Theology.

After returning to Texas, Cepeda was given teaching and formation responsibilities at  Assumption Seminary and the Oblate School of Theology in San Antonio. He also served as vocation director and faculty member for the Transitional Ministry Formation Program for the archdiocese, and as a member of the Formation faculty of the St. Peter upon the Water Center in Ingram, Texas. Cepeda was named as vice rector of Assumption Seminary in 2009 and rector in 2010, a position he still holds.

Auxiliary Bishop of Detroit 
Cepeda was appointed titular Bishop of Tagase and auxiliary bishop of the Archdiocese of Detroit on April 18, 2011, by Pope Benedict XVI. He was installed and consecrated by Archbishop Allen Vigneron on May 5, 2011, becoming the youngest bishop in the United States at age 41.

See also

Roman Catholic Archdiocese of Detroit
 Catholic Church hierarchy
 Catholic Church in the United States
 Historical list of the Catholic bishops of the United States
 List of Catholic bishops of the United States
 Lists of patriarchs, archbishops, and bishops

References

External links
Roman Catholic Archdiocese of Detroit Official Site
Catholic-Hierarchy

Episcopal succession
 

21st-century American Roman Catholic titular bishops
1969 births
Living people
Mexican emigrants to the United States
Roman Catholic Archdiocese of Detroit
Religious leaders from Michigan